Wang Lichao(born 3 November 1993) is a Chinese Paralympic swimmer. He represented China at the 2016 Summer Paralympics held in Rio de Janeiro, Brazil and he won the bronze medal in the men's 50 metre butterfly S6 event. In 2019, he competed at the 2019 World Para Swimming Championships held in London, United Kingdom.

References

External links 
 

1993 births
Living people
Chinese male butterfly swimmers
Paralympic swimmers of China
Paralympic medalists in swimming
Paralympic silver medalists for China
Paralympic bronze medalists for China
Swimmers at the 2016 Summer Paralympics
Swimmers at the 2020 Summer Paralympics
Medalists at the 2016 Summer Paralympics
Medalists at the 2020 Summer Paralympics
Medalists at the World Para Swimming Championships
Place of birth missing (living people)
Chinese male backstroke swimmers
S5-classified Paralympic swimmers
21st-century Chinese people